The Dean of Kilmore is based at the Cathedral Church of St Fethlimidh in Kilmore in the Diocese of Kilmore within the united bishopric of Kilmore, Elphin and Ardagh. Prior to the 1841 amalgamation the cathedral was in the bishopric of Kilmore and Ardagh.

The current dean is the Very Reverend Nigel Crossey, former chaplain at St Columba's College.

List of deans of Kilmore
1619–1627 John Hill 
1627–1637 Nicholas Bernard (afterwards Dean of Ardagh) 
1637–1645 Henry Jones (afterwards Bishop of Clogher 1645) 
1645–? Lewis Downes 
1664–? Edward Dixie 
?1690 William Jephson
1691–1700 Enoch Reader (afterwards Dean of Emly 1700) 
1700–1700 Richard Reader
1700–1734 Jeremiah William Marsh
1734–1751 John Madden
1751–1765 Hon Henry Maxwell (afterwards Bishop of Dromore 1765) 
1765–1768 Charles Agar (afterwards Bishop of Cloyne 1768) 
1768–1797 Thomas Webb
1797–1801 George de la Poer Beresford (afterwards Bishop of Clonfert and Kilmacduagh 1801) 
1801–1825 William Magenis
1825–1860 Henry Vesey-Fitzgerald, 3rd Baron FitzGerald and Vesey
1860–1870 Thomas Carson (afterwards Bishop of Kilmore, Elphin and Ardagh 1870) 
1872–? John Maunsell Massy-Beresford 
1886–? William H. Stone
1913–? Isaac Coulter (died 1934)
1931–1955 William James Askins
1955-1984 Robert Christopher 'Howard' Turkington
1990–? Charles Combe
1997–2004 David Godfrey
2005–2014 Wallace Raymond Ferguson
2015–Present Nigel Crossey

References

 
Diocese of Kilmore, Elphin and Ardagh
Kilmore